Anette Bøe (born 5 November 1957 in Larvik) is a former Norwegian cross-country skier.
Bøe won her first international medal when she took the bronze at the 1980 Winter Olympics in Lake Placid on the 4 × 5 km relay.  She won the 20 km event at the Holmenkollen ski festival twice, in 1984 and 1985.

Bøe's biggest successes as a cross-country skier were at the FIS Nordic World Ski Championships, where she took gold in the 4 × 5 km relay (1982) and the 10 km (1985), silver in the 4 × 5 km relay (1985, 1987), and a bronze in the 20 km (1985).  She also won the FIS Cross-Country World Cup in 1985.

Bøe was awarded the Holmenkollen medal in 1985 (shared with Per Bergerud and Gunde Svan).

In 2000, she received the Egebergs Ærespris for her achievements in cross-country skiing and ice hockey.

Cross-country skiing results
All results are sourced from the International Ski Federation (FIS).

Olympic Games
 1 medal – (1 bronze)

World Championships
 6 medals – (3 gold, 2 silver, 1 bronze)

World Cup

Season standings

Individual podiums
9 victories
12 podiums

Team podiums

 4 victories 
 8 podiums

Note:   Until the 1999 World Championships, World Championship races were included in the World Cup scoring system.

References

 Holmenkollen medalists – click Holmenkollmedaljen for downloadable pdf file 
 Holmenkollen winners since 1892 – click Vinnere for downloadable pdf file

External links
 

1957 births
Cross-country skiers at the 1980 Winter Olympics
Holmenkollen medalists
Holmenkollen Ski Festival winners
Living people
Norwegian female cross-country skiers
Olympic cross-country skiers of Norway
Olympic bronze medalists for Norway
People from Larvik
Norwegian ice hockey players
Norwegian Christians
Olympic medalists in cross-country skiing
FIS Nordic World Ski Championships medalists in cross-country skiing
FIS Cross-Country World Cup champions
Medalists at the 1980 Winter Olympics
Sportspeople from Vestfold og Telemark